"The Daily Mail" and "Staircase" are songs by the English alternative rock band Radiohead, released as a download on 19 December 2011. Both recordings are taken from the live video The King of Limbs: Live from the Basement (2011), and feature additional drummer and percussionist Clive Deamer.

Recording 
Both songs are taken from the live video The King of Limbs: Live from the Basement (2011), and feature the additional drummer and percussionist Clive Deamer.

"The Daily Mail" was written six years before release. When Radiohead decided to perform it for From the Basement, they completed the arrangement within a week, featuring a brass section arranged by the guitarist Jonny Greenwood. The song criticises the Daily Mail, a British tabloid newspaper, with lyrics such as "the lunatics have taken over the asylum" and "we'll feed you to the hounds / to the Daily Mail". Vulture described it as a "piano ballad that grows, bolstered by fury ... into a swaggering anthem".

"Staircase" features "atmospheric" synthesisers and "busy, skittering" beats. Radiohead worked on it before their eighth album, The King of Limbs (2011), but it did not progress beyond the demo stages until after the album's release.

Reception 
Reviewing a performance on The Colbert Report, Guardian writer Hadley Freeman wrote that "The Daily Mail" was "a funny idea" but "barely touches its nigh on unmissable target". However, a 2020 Guardian article by Jazz Monroe named it the 39th best Radiohead song: "It’s irresistible, suggesting an unlikely kinship between Radiohead and the venerable pop cynic Randy Newman: musical-theatre flair weaponised against tabloid hysteria." The Stereogum writer Chris Deville said that "The Daily Mail" was "among Yorke’s most powerful piano rockers", and described "Staircase" as "like a Hot Chip song descending into purgatory (in the best way)". He speculated that The King of Limbs would be a fan favourite had it included the songs along with "Supercollider" and "The Butcher", also released that year.

Track listing

Charts

References

External links
 
 "Staircase" video in From the Basement

Radiohead songs
2011 singles
Song recordings produced by Nigel Godrich
2011 songs